The Mobile Bears were an American minor league baseball team based in Mobile, Alabama. The franchise was a member of the old Southern Association, a high-level circuit that folded after the 1961 season. Mobile joined the SA in 1908 as the Sea Gulls, but changed its name to the Bears in 1918, and the nickname stuck. The club played in the Association until July 1931, when it moved to Knoxville, Tennessee. Almost exactly 13 years later, in July 1944, the Bears returned to Mobile when the Knoxville Smokies franchise shifted back from Tennessee. (A club known as the Mobile Shippers competed in the Class B Southeastern League from 1937 to 1942.)

The Bears then continued in the SA (classified as a Double-A league in 1946) through its final season. During the 1940s and 1950s, the club was a longtime farm system affiliate of the Brooklyn Dodgers, then the Cleveland Indians. The Bears played in 5,000-seat Hartwell Field located on Virginia Street in midtown.

The nickname "Bears" lived on in modified form with the Mobile BayBears of the Double-A Southern League, who played 23 seasons (1997–2019) in Mobile before relocating to metropolitan Huntsville, Alabama.

The Bears won the Dixie Series, a postseason interleague championship between the champions of the Southern Association and the Texas League, in 1922 and 1955.

References

External links
Baseball Reference

Brooklyn Dodgers minor league affiliates
Cleveland Guardians minor league affiliates
Chicago White Sox minor league affiliates
Kansas City Athletics minor league affiliates
New York Mets minor league affiliates
St. Louis Cardinals minor league affiliates
Defunct minor league baseball teams
Sports in Mobile, Alabama
Professional baseball teams in Alabama
Defunct Southern League (1964–present) teams
Southern League (1885–1899) teams
Defunct Southern Association teams
Defunct Southeastern League teams
Defunct Cotton States League teams
Defunct Interstate League teams
Defunct Gulf League teams
Baseball teams established in 1886
Baseball teams disestablished in 1970
1886 establishments in Alabama
1970 disestablishments in Alabama
Defunct baseball teams in Alabama